Secret Empire may refer to:

 Secret Empire (organization), an evil organization in Marvel Comics
 Secret Empire (comics), a Marvel Comics storyline
 "The Secret Empire", an episode of the TV series Cliffhangers